Rosacea is a genus in the Prayidae. The genus contains bioluminescent species.

References

Prayidae
Hydrozoan genera
Bioluminescent cnidarians